Doddiana callizona is a species of snout moth. It was described by Oswald Bertram Lower in 1896 and is found in Australia.

References

Epipaschiinae
Moths described in 1896